Nanjundi Kalyana is a 1989 Indian Kannada-language romantic comedy film, directed by M. S. Rajashekar, starring newcomers Raghavendra Rajkumar and Malashri, with Girija Lokesh and Sundar Krishna Urs as the lead cast. The film was a major blockbuster of the year and was one among the biggest grossing Kannada films of 1989. The movie saw a theatrical run of 90 weeks.

The story is based on Parvathavani's Kannada play Bahaddur Ganda which was a translation of William Shakespeare's comedy The Taming of the Shrew. The film was remade in Telugu in 1990 as Mahajananiki Maradalu Pilla. Upendra Kumar, who had composed the songs for this movie, was also the music director for the Telugu version and he retained all the six songs from this movie in the Telugu version.

Plot 
The film is a family drama which starts with the Gauri Ganesha festival. While offering pooja to goddess Gauri, Girija Lokesh (mother) of Raghuchandra (Raghavendra Rajkumar) receives a money order as a gift of a festival from her brother. She is excited at the affection of her brother on sending the gift. Seeing this, the father of Raghuchandra remembers his past of having his sister and brother in law (Sundar Krishna Urs) living in his home and on this festival when he gives a gift to his sister, the brother in law fights for some reason and leaves the home with his wife. The father tells his son (Raghuchandra) these past feelings and says that at childhood he and his sister had thought of marrying Raghuchandra with Devi (Malashri).

Raghuchandra moves to the city to his aunt's home with the name of Nanjundi (his uncle who had died 20 years earlier). Sundar Krishna urs thinks that he is truly Nanjundi and allows him to live in his home. After Sundar Krishna urs left the village, they had 2 more daughters Laxmi and Saraswati, whom Raghuchandra does not know. Nanjundi (Raghavendra Rajkumar) has to marry eldest of the daughter Devi. She is very arrogant and not interested in marriage, because of her the other two sisters marriage who had been engaged to Krishnamurthy (Balaraj) and Puttaswamy (Chi Ravi Shankar) is being continuously postponed.

Even Devi's parents are fed up of convincing her for marriage. Finally, when Nanjundi convinces that he is ready to marry the Devi, her parents says that he should convince her himself. He does propose and performs stunts to convince her, in response, she sends fighters to hit him. When all her plans fail, she will be ready to marry him and to let him as her servant after marriage. All three sisters get married on the same day without the presence of Nanjundi's (Raghuchandra) parents. After marriage, he takes to the village where he lives in their house-servant house. He acknowledges her that he is only a servant and not Nanjundi. He had cheated her and her parents. At the end when her parents come to the village she will have been left all her old styles and arrogance and she wants to live in that small house with her husband. Finally, all of them know the truth that the son in law is none other than Raghuchandra.

Cast 

 Raghavendra Rajkumar as Raghuchandra/Nanjundi (in disguise)
 Malashri as Devi
 Balaraj as Raghuchandra's friend
 Lalitanjali
 Chi Ravishankar as Raghuchandra's friend
 Girija Lokesh as Raghuchandra's mother
 Sundar Krishna Urs as Devi's father
 Shubha as Devi's mother
 Thoogudeepa Srinivas
 Mysore Lokesh
 Dheerendra Gopal
 Sathyabhama

Production 
Writer and lyricist Chi. Udaya Shankar first introduced Sridurga to the Rajkumar family, who were on the lookout for a fresh face. In a lead role, she was introduced first by the Parvathamma Rajkumar, and cast her opposite her son Raghavendra Rajkumar for the film, who also changed her name as Malashri. According to Muralidhara Khajane of The Hindu that the plot was similar to the story Taming of the Shrew by William Shakespeare.

Soundtrack 
The songs composed by Upendra Kumar were well received and were among the top chart-busters in the Kannada film industry. The song "Olage Seridare Gundu" rendered by Manjula Gururaj became very popular and made Malashri famous among the masses. The song was remixed in 2014 film Gharshane also starred Malashree.

Upendra Kumar retained all the six songs from this movie in the Telugu version.

Kannada Version

Telugu Version

This film was dubbed into Telugu as Naaku Mogudu Kavali. All songs were written by Rajasri.

Reception
Upon release the movie received positive reviews. The movie ran for over 535 days becoming the then second longest running Kannada movie after Bangarada Manushya and was declared a Blockbuster. The movie was the highest-grossing movie of the year. The movie had a theatrical run of 203 days at Indi, 112 days at Saligrama, 238 days at Banahatti, 119 days at Udupi, 112 days at Karwar and 133 days at Tiptur.

References

External links 
 Nanjundi Kalyana - 1989 Video CD, Kannada Store Kannada Video CD Buy DVD, VCD, Blu-ray, Audio CD, MP3 CD, Books, Free Shipping
 Nanjundi Kalyana songs

1989 films
1980s Kannada-language films
Films directed by M. S. Rajashekar
Indian comedy-drama films
Kannada films remade in other languages
Films scored by Upendra Kumar
Films with screenplays by Chi. Udayashankar
Films based on The Taming of the Shrew
1989 comedy-drama films